The South Africa national korfball team is managed by the South African Korfball Federation (SAKF), representing South Africa in korfball international competitions.

In 2014 they won their third African Championship, held in Zambia.

Tournament history

Current squad
National team in the 2011 World Championships

 Coach: Gertjie Theyse

References

External links
 South African Korfball Federation

National korfball teams
Korfball
National team